The Page baronetcy of Greenwich, Kent, was a title in the Baronetage of Great Britain. It was created on 3 December 1714 during the reign of King George I of Great Britain for wealthy London merchant and Member of Parliament, Gregory Page. Three successive generations of the same family were each named Gregory Page: the first baronet's father, who was also a merchant in London, and the first and second baronets. The baronetcy became extinct on the death of the childless second baronet in 1775.

Page baronets, of Greenwich, Kent (1714)
 Sir Gregory Page, 1st Baronet ( – 25 May 1720)
 Sir Gregory Page, 2nd Baronet ( – 4 August 1775)

See also
Page Wood baronets

References

Extinct baronetcies in the Baronetage of Great Britain
1714 establishments in Great Britain